Léopold Nègre (15 June 1879 – 29 July 1961) was a French physician and biologist born in Montpellier.

He studied natural sciences at the University of Montpellier, followed by courses in microbiology at the Pasteur Institute in Paris. From 1907 to 1910, he served as préparateur at the laboratory of microbiology courses headed by Amédée Borrel (1867–1936). In 1910, he obtained his doctorate of medicine. Following an internship at the Pasteur Institute in Lille, he was appointed laboratory chief (microbial analysis) at the Pasteur Institute in Algiers. In 1918 he received his doctorate of natural sciences.

In 1919, he was assigned to the laboratory of tuberculosis headed by Albert Calmette (1863–1933) at the Pasteur Institute in Paris. Here he took part in research of Bacillus Calmette-Guérin (BCG vaccine). With microbiologist Alfred Boquet (1879–1947) he developed antigene méthylique (methyl antigen) for treatment of tuberculosis.

In 1931, Nègre became chair at the Institut Pasteur, and in 1944 was named vice president of the Société de biologie. He was also president of the Société française de la tuberculose (1950) and a member of the Académie de Médecine (hygiene section, from 1951).

Selected writings 
 Infections à bacille pseudo-dysentériques en Algérie (Infections by pseudo-dysenteric bacillus in Algeria) 1916
 Bacilles paradysentériques isolés en Algérie (Paradysenteric bacilli isolated in Algeria) 1917
 Résultats des vaccinations triples antityphoïdiques et antiparatyphoïdiques dans les troupes d'Alger (Results of typhoid and paratyphoid vaccinations of troops in Algiers) 1917
 Lymphangite epizootique des solipèdes : contribution a l'ètude des mycoses (Epizootic lymphangitis of solipeds: contribution to the study of fungi) with Alfred Boquet; 1920
 Antigénothérapie de la tuberculose par les extraits méthyliques de bacilles de Koch (Antigen therapy of tuberculosis by extracts of tubercle bacilli methyl) with Alfred Boquet; 1927
 Le traitement de la tuberculose par l'antigène méthylique (antigénothérapie) (Treatment of tuberculosis by antigen-methyl (antigen therapy) with Alfred Boquet; 1932
 Albert Calmette, sa vie, son oeuvre scientifique (Albert Calmette, his life, his scientific work) 1939
 Vaccination par le BCG par scarifications cutanées (BCG vaccination by skin scarification) with J. Breley; 1942
 Prévention et traitement spécifiques de la tuberculose par le BCG et par l'antigène méthylique (Prevention and treatment of specific tuberculosis with BCG and antigen methyl)  1956

References 
 Service des Archives de l'Institut Pasteur (biography)
 IDREF (list of publications)
 Léopold Nègre (biographies and documents)

French microbiologists
Physicians from Montpellier
1879 births
1961 deaths